Miki Michelle Ishikawa (born July 29, 1991) is an American actress and singer. She is known for her role as Amy Yoshida on the second season of The Terror, and for being part of the music group T-Squad.

Career
Miki Ishikawa started her career when she signed on to Disney Records as part of the group T-Squad. During this time she had toured with the Jonas Brothers, Miley Cyrus and The Cheetah Girls and was starring on the Nickelodeon series Zoey 101. Since T-Squad's disbandment, she has pursued a solo career.

Miki appeared in several other projects such as Make Your Move where she had a supporting role followed by an Asian drama called Sway. She won the series regular role Amy Yoshida on The Terror; a role that she felt close to. "I identify as second generation, so, in reading for Amy, it felt like we were very similar and I felt very close and connected to the character."

She guest starred as Leah in the Disney+ series The Falcon and the Winter Soldier, which is part of Marvel Cinematic Universe.

Personal life
Miki is a member of the UNICEF Tap Project; raising awareness for those who do not have access to clean water.

Filmography

References

External links
 

1991 births
Actresses from Colorado
Actresses from Denver
American actresses of Japanese descent
American film actors of Asian descent
Living people
21st-century American actresses
American film actresses
American television actresses
Singers from Denver
American singers of Asian descent
21st-century American women singers
American child actresses
American child singers
21st-century American singers